The Armdale Yacht Club is a yacht club located on Melville Island, at the  head of Halifax Harbour's Northwest Arm in Nova Scotia, Canada. The Club's property has a history dating to 1732.

Melville Island

Since the arrival of European settlers in the area, Melville Island has been a family estate, hospital, quarantine station, military prison, prisoner of war camp, recruit training station for the British Foreign Legion, ammunition depot and most recently a yacht club.

Partnerships
The AYC has reciprocal agreements with other yacht clubs, e.g. Britannia Yacht Club

References

External links

 Armdale Yacht Club.

Yacht clubs in Canada
Sports venues in Halifax, Nova Scotia
1947 establishments in Nova Scotia